Alvin Isaac Kallicharran  (born 21 March 1949) is a former Indo-Guyanese cricketer of  Tamil origin who played Test cricket for the West Indies between 1972 and 1981 as a left-handed batsman and right-arm off spinner.

Kallicharran was born in Port Mourant, British Guiana (now Guyana), where he started playing street cricket until his professional debut as captain of the under-16 Guyana team in 1966 and his first class debut in 1967.

He was a Wisden Cricketer of the Year for 1983. He was part of the 1975 and 1979 teams that won the Cricket World Cup. His highest score is 187 against India in the 1978–79 tour. He also found success with Warwickshire in English County cricket. While playing against minor county Oxfordshire in the 1984 one day Natwest Trophy he scored 206 and took 6 for 32.

One of his most noted international innings, a knock of 158 against England, was shrouded in controversy when he was run out by Tony Greig on the final ball of the second day. After the ball had been defended and Kallicharran had started to walk off, Grieg threw down the stumps at the non-striker's end, running him out. After negotiations off the pitch, England withdrew their appeal, allowing Kallicharran to continue the next morning.

He attempted to join World Series Cricket, but failed, and was appointed captain of the West Indies in 1977–1978 when Clive Lloyd resigned over the Kerry Packer issue.

Kallicharan was later involved in further controversy when he led an unofficial rebel tour to South Africa in defiance of the Gleneagles Agreement and anti-apartheid protesters in that country who asserted that official sporting structures were discriminatory. He saw out the rest of his career playing for Orange Free State and Transvaal in South African domestic cricket.

Family 
His brother Derek played first class cricket for Guyana and later the United States of America. His nephews, Mahendra Nagamootoo and Vishal Nagamootoo, are also cricketers.

Presently, Kallicharran lives with his wife, Patsy, and is involved in coaching cricket among youth at Triangle Cricket League in Morrisville, North Carolina. He was awarded the British Empire Medal in the 2019 New Year's Honours List for services to cricket and charity.

In 2019, he was a mentor for Puducherry men's and women's cricket teams.

References

External links
 
 

1949 births
Living people
Cricketers at the 1975 Cricket World Cup
Cricketers at the 1979 Cricket World Cup
West Indies One Day International cricketers
West Indies Test cricketers
West Indies Test cricket captains
Cricketers who made a century on Test debut
Guyanese cricketers
Free State cricketers
Queensland cricketers
Gauteng cricketers
Warwickshire cricketers
Berbice cricketers
Wisden Cricketers of the Year
Herefordshire cricketers
Shropshire cricketers
Guyana cricketers
Indo-Guyanese people
Guyanese Hindus
Sportspeople from Georgetown, Guyana
Sportspeople of Indian descent
Guyanese cricket coaches